Daniella Kolodny is the first female rabbi enlisted in the United States Naval Academy, which she joined in 2004. She was ordained by the Jewish Theological Seminary that year.
In 2010 the Conservative Rabbinical Assembly appointed Kolodny as its Community Development Coordinator.

She was born in Jerusalem but raised in Maryland, and earned a degree in international relations from the Pardee School of Global Studies at  Boston University, as well as master's degrees in public administration and Jewish communally service from Hebrew Union College-Jewish Institute of Religion in Los Angeles.

References

Living people
Year of birth missing (living people)
American Conservative rabbis
Israeli emigrants to the United States
Israeli Conservative rabbis
People from Jerusalem
Conservative women rabbis
Female United States Navy personnel
Boston University College of Arts and Sciences alumni
Hebrew Union College – Jewish Institute of Religion alumni
United States Navy sailors
21st-century American Jews
21st-century American women